The 2007 Micronesian Championships in Athletics took place between December 14–15, 2007.  The event was held at the Leo Palace Resort in Mannengon Hills, Yona, Guam.  Detailed reports were given for the OAA.

A total of 42 events were contested, 20 by men, 19 by women, 1 mixed, 1 by boys, and 1 by girls.

Medal summary
Complete results can be found on the Oceania Athletics Association webpage.

Men

Women

Mixed

Boys

Girls

Medal table (unofficial)
The published medal count contains the results of the 60 metres sprints elsewhere dubbed as "invitational," but not the mixed medley relay, explaining the difference to the unofficial count below.

†: Including medley relay medal.

Participation
According to an unofficial count, 103 athletes from 7 countries participated.

 (48)
 (6)
 (2)
 (12)
 (7)
 (11)
 (17)

References

Micronesian Championships in Athletics
Athletics in Guam
Sports in Guam
Micronesia
2007 in Guamanian sports
International sports competitions hosted by Guam
December 2007 sports events in Oceania